Denmark Hill is an area and road in Camberwell, in the London Borough of Southwark. It is a sub-section of the western flank of the Norwood Ridge, centred on the long, curved Ruskin Park slope of the ridge. The road is part of the A215 which north of its main foot, Camberwell Green, becomes Camberwell Road and south of Red Post Hill becomes named Herne Hill, another district.

Toponymy
The area and road is said to have acquired its name from Queen Anne's husband, Prince George of Denmark, who hunted there. High Street, Camberwell was renamed Denmark Hill as part of metropolitan street renaming.

History
In John Cary's map of 1786 the area is shown as Dulwich Hill. The only building apparent is the "Fox under the Hill". The present "Fox on the Hill" pub is a hundred yards or so further up (south), on the site of former St Matthew's Vicarage adjacent to a triangle of land rumoured to be a "plague pit" or burial ground. The name of the area was changed in honour of the husband of Queen Anne, Prince George of Denmark.

The area is home of the Maudsley Hospital and King's College Hospital, and also of Ruskin Park, named after John Ruskin, who once lived nearby. The preface to his work Unto This Last is dated "Denmark Hill, 10th May, 1862". The Institute of Psychiatry is based behind the Maudsley Hospital, a school of King's College London (University of London). The college also has a hall of residence immediately east at Champion Hill.

The Salvation Army's William Booth Memorial Training College on Champion Park which was designed by Giles Gilbert Scott was completed in 1932; it towers over south London. It has a similar monumental impressiveness to Gilbert Scott's other south London buildings, Battersea Power Station and Bankside Power Station (now housing Tate Modern), although its simplicity is partly the result of repeated budget cuts during its construction: much more detail, including carved Gothic stonework surrounding the windows, was originally planned.

Shepherd's Bush F.C. played in the area as Old St Stephen's F.C.

Geography
Its postcode is SE5. North-east and south-easterly slopes of the same eminence are named Grove Hill and Dog Kennel Hill, on top of which the summit is shared with Champion Hill, the only division being proximity to the respective two affluent streets which intersect on Camberwell descent. From Camberwell Green northwards the land is much lower and very gently sloped as in northern Brixton at its other foot, in the west. There are good views across central London from vantage points (e.g. top-storey windows). On a clear day some viewers can read the time on the Big Ben clockface.

Transport

Denmark Hill has a major transport interchange served by London Overground, Southeastern and Thameslink rail services and London Buses.

Rail
Denmark Hill railway station is served by Southeastern services to London Victoria via Bexleyheath and Dartford via Bexleyheath. Thameslink operate services to London Blackfriars and Sevenoaks and Orpington.

Buses
Denmark Hill is served by many Transport for London bus services connecting it with areas including Central London, Croydon, Norwood, Dulwich, Peckham and Penge.

Sites of interest

Ruskin Park

Ruskin Park is a public park at the centre of the long curved slope and half of crest summit area which is Denmark Hill. It is named after John Ruskin (1819–1900), who lived near the park.

Weston Education Centre

The Weston Education Centre, with its medical library, is in Denmark Hill.

Notable people
Among those who were born or lived in Denmark Hill are:

Samuel Prout (1783–1852), artist
Sir Henry Bessemer (1813–1898), inventor
John Belcher (1841–1913), architect
Philip Mainwaring Johnston (1865–1936), architect
John Cyril Porte (1884–1919), aviator
Arthur Vigers (1890–1968), flying ace
Albert Houthuesen (1903–1979) artist
Catherine Dean (1905–1983), artist
Stan Tracey (1926–2013), jazz pianist and composer
Danny Kirwan (1950–2018), guitarist of Fleetwood Mac from 1968 to 1972
Lorraine Chase (b. 1951), actress
Jenny Agutter (b. 1952), actress
Jeremy Bowen, BBC News reporter
Jenny Eclair (b. 1960), comedian/writer
Lord Nicholas Windsor (b. 1970), member of the Royal Family
Rio Ferdinand (b. 1978), footballer
Cush Jumbo (b. 1985), actress

See also
Champion Hill
Herne Hill
Norwood Ridge
Roller Hockey

References

Further reading 
 Shores, Christopher F.; Franks, Norman L. R.; Guest, Russell. Above the Trenches: A Complete Record of the Fighter Aces and Units of the British Empire Air Forces 1915–1920, Grub Street, 1990.

External links 

 Camberwell Society
 SE5 Forum, a community group

Areas of London
King's College London
Streets in the London Borough of Southwark
Camberwell
Prince George of Denmark